Viggo Brun (13 October 1885 – 15 August 1978) was a Norwegian professor, mathematician and number theorist.

Contributions
In 1915, he introduced a new method, based on Legendre's version of the sieve of Eratosthenes, now known as the Brun sieve, which addresses additive problems such as Goldbach's conjecture and the twin prime conjecture. He used it to prove that there exist infinitely many integers n such that n and n+2 have at most nine prime factors, and that all large even integers are the sum of two numbers with at most nine prime factors.

He also showed that the sum of the reciprocals of twin primes converges to a finite value, now called Brun's constant: by contrast, the sum of the reciprocals of all primes is divergent. He developed a multi-dimensional continued fraction algorithm in 1919–1920 and applied this to problems in musical theory. He also served as praeses of the Royal Norwegian Society of Sciences and Letters in 1946.

Biography
Brun was born at Lier in Buskerud, Norway. He studied at the University of Oslo and began research at the University of Göttingen in 1910.  In 1923, Brun became a professor at the 
Technical University in Trondheim and in 1946 a professor at the University of Oslo.

He retired in 1955 at the age of 70 and died in 1978 (at 92 years-old) at Drøbak in Akershus, Norway.

See also
 Brun's theorem
 Brun-Titchmarsh theorem
 Brun sieve
 Sieve theory

References

Other sources
 H. Halberstam and H. E. Richert, Sieve methods, Academic Press (1974) .  Gives an account of Brun's sieve.
 C.J. Scriba, Viggo Brun, Historia Mathematica 7 (1980) 1–6.
 C.J. Scriba, Zur Erinnerung an Viggo Brun, Mitt. Math. Ges. Hamburg 11 (1985) 271-290

External links
Brun's Constant
Brun's Pure Sieve
 Viggo Brun personal archive exists at NTN University Library Dorabiblioteket

 
 

1885 births
1978 deaths
People from Lier, Norway
Norwegian mathematicians
20th-century Norwegian mathematicians
Number theorists
University of Oslo alumni
Academic staff of the Norwegian Institute of Technology
Academic staff of the University of Oslo
Royal Norwegian Society of Sciences and Letters
People from Frogn
Presidents of the Norwegian Mathematical Society